Bestia can refer to:
 Bestia (1917 film), Polish silent film
 Bestia (2021 film), Chilean short film
 Bestia (game), Italian card game
 Bestia 666 (b. 1989), Mexican wrestler
 Bestia (plant), genus of moss
 Calpurnii Bestiae, ancient Romans